Elena Lohner (born 19 July 2001) is a Liechtensteiner footballer who plays as a defender for Triesen and the Liechtenstein national football team.

Career statistics

International

References

2001 births
Living people
Women's association football defenders
Liechtenstein women's international footballers
Liechtenstein women's footballers